Cagnano Varano is a town and comune in the province of Foggia in the Apulia region of southeast Italy. It occupies a commanding position above the Lago di Varano, and is part of the Gargano National Park. The economy is mostly based on agriculture, fishing and tourism.

Sights include the karstic grotto of San Michele, which has been frequented since the Old Stone Age. It is now consecrated as a Roman Catholic chapel.

References

External links
 Official website

Cities and towns in Apulia